Scotlandville Magnet High School (SMHS) is a public high school in Baton Rouge, Louisiana, United States. Scotlandville High is part of the East Baton Rouge Parish Public Schools.

The school serves the Scotlandville neighborhood of Baton Rouge as well as a section of the Brownfields census-designated place.

Feeder patterns
The following elementary schools feed into Scotlandville:
 Crestworth
 Progress and Ryan (Scotlandville Family of Schools)
 Brownfields (partial)
 White Hills (partial)

Residents zoned to Scotlandville High School are zoned to Crestworth Middle School;  it is controlled by the Recovery School District (RSD). Park Forest Middle School is an option for those in the Crestworth zone.

Athletics
Scotlandville Magnet High athletics competes in the LHSAA.

Championships
Football Championships
(1) State Championship: 1969

Notable alumni
 Horace Belton, former NFL running back
 Brandon Bolden, NFL running back
 Jorrick Calvin, former NFL defensive back
 Stormy Daniels, adult actress
 Dontrell Hilliard, NFL running back
 Damian Jones, NBA center
 Kelvin Joseph, NFL defensive back and rapper
 Korey Lindsey, former NFL cornerback
 Leon Seals, former NFL defensive end
 Javonte Smart, basketball player
 Tanzel Smart, NFL defensive tackle
 Dallas Thomas, former NFL offensive tackle
 Shalanda Young, director of the Office of Management and Budget in the Cabinet of Joe Biden

References

External links
 Scotlandville Magnet High

Schools in Baton Rouge, Louisiana
Magnet schools in Louisiana
Public high schools in Louisiana